Marcelo Henrique de Aguiar Quarterole (born 28 September 1978), known as Marcelinho, is a Brazilian professional football coach and former player who played as a striker.

Career
He was on loan to Botafogo in 2005 and 2006 Brazilian football season.

He was loaned out again at Náutico on 27 April 2007.

In January 2008, he signed a new contract with Cabofriense, last until June 2009, but he was then on loan to U.D. Leiria until June 2008.

He then loaned to Paraná at Campeonato Brasileiro Série B 2008.

In July 2009, he signed a one-year deal with Santa Cruz and in August 2009 he joined Campinense on loan until the end of season.

He joined Campinense on free transfer after his contract with Santa Cruz expired in December 2010.

References

External links
 Brazilian FA database
sambafoot.com
 2007-08 Profile at Portuguese Liga

1978 births
Footballers from Rio de Janeiro (city)
Living people
Brazilian footballers
Brazilian football managers
Brazilian expatriate footballers
Association football forwards
Expatriate footballers in Portugal
Campeonato Brasileiro Série A players
Campeonato Brasileiro Série B players
Campeonato Brasileiro Série C players
Campeonato Brasileiro Série D players
Primeira Liga players
Associação Desportiva Cabofriense players
Botafogo de Futebol e Regatas players
Clube Náutico Capibaribe players
U.D. Leiria players
Paraná Clube players
Santa Cruz Futebol Clube players
Campinense Clube players
Operário Ferroviário Esporte Clube players
Associação Cultural Esporte Clube Baraúnas players
America Football Club (RJ) players
Desportiva Ferroviária managers